The Women's aerials event in freestyle skiing at the 2018 Winter Olympics took place on 15 and 16 February 2018 at the Bogwang Phoenix Park, Pyeongchang, South Korea.

Qualification

The top 25 athletes in the Olympic quota allocation list qualified, with a maximum of four athletes per National Olympic Committee (NOC) allowed. All athletes qualifying must also have placed in the top 30 FIS World Cup event or FIS Freestyle World Ski Championships during the qualification period (July 1, 2016 to January 21, 2018) and also have a minimum of 80 FIS points to compete. If the host country, South Korea at the 2018 Winter Olympics did not qualify, their chosen athlete would displace the last qualified athlete, granted all qualification criterion was met.

Results

Qualification 1
The qualification was held on 15 February at 20:00.

Qualification 2
The qualification was held on 15 February at 20:45.

Finals
The final was held on 16 February at 20:00.

References

Women's freestyle skiing at the 2018 Winter Olympics